William Owen Steele (December 22, 1917 – June 25, 1979) was an American author from Tennessee.

Biography

Early life
William O. Steele was born on December 22, 1917 in Franklin, Tennessee. He was the son of Isore Steele and Susie Lee. He spent a large amount of his youth exploring the woods around his home. This led to an interest in the history of the area and of its pioneers. He attended Cumberland University.

Career
He became the author of thirty-nine books. He wrote his historical adventure stories in his home on Signal Mountain, Tennessee, which was the setting for many of his fiction stories. His book, The Perilous Road, which was published in 1958, won the Newbery Honor in 1959.  Winter Danger earned the Lewis Carroll Shelf Award in 1962.

Personal life
He was married to another author, Mary Quintard Govan.

Death
He died on June 25, 1979 at the age of 61.

Bibliography
The Golden Root (1951)
The Buffalo Knife (1952)
Over-Mountain Boy (1952)
John Sevier Pioneer Boy (1953)
Wilderness Journey (1953)
The Story of Daniel Boone (1953) 
Winter Danger (1954)
The Story of Leif Ericson (1954)
Tomahawks and Trouble (1955)
We Were There on the Oregon Trail (1955)
Davy Crockett's Earthquake (1956)
De Soto Child of the Sun (1956) 
Lone Hunt (1956)
We Were There with the Pony Express (1956)
Daniel Boone's Echo (1957)
Flaming Arrows (1957)
The Perilous Road (1958)
Andy Jackson's Water Well (1959)
The Far Frontier (1959)
The Spooky Thing (1960)
Francis Marion Young Swamp Fox (1962)
Westward Adventure (1962)
The Year of the Bloody Sevens (1963)
The No-Name Man of the Mountain (1964)
Wayah of the Real People (1964)
The Trail Through Danger (1965)
The Tomahawk Border (1966)
Old Wilderness Road (1968)
Hound Dog Zip to the Rescue (1970)
Henry Woodward of Carolina (1972)
Triple Trouble for Hound Dog Zip (1972)
Wilderness Tattoo (1972)
Eye in the Forest (1975)
John's Secret Treasure (1975)
The Man with the Silver Eyes (1976)
Cherokee Crown of Tannassy (1977)
The Talking Bones (1978)
War Party (1978)
The Magic Amulet (1979)

References

External links
 

 Book Availability

American children's writers
1917 births
1979 deaths
People from Franklin, Tennessee
Writers from Tennessee
Newbery Honor winners
People from Signal Mountain, Tennessee